Optediceros breviculum, common name the red mangrove snail, is a species of minute operculate snail, a freshwater or marine gastropod mollusk or micromollusk in the family Assimineidae.

Distribution
The distribution of Optediceros breviculum includes:

 Bangladesh
 China and Hong Kong and Taiwan
 West Bengal in India
 Japan
 Malaysia
 Myanmar
 Philippines
 Singapore
 Sri Lanka
 Thailand
 Vietnam

References

 Blanford, W. T. 1867. Descriptions of some Indian and Burmese species of Assiminea. Annals And Magazine of Natural History 19: 381-386.

External links
 Fukuda H. & Ponder W.F. 2003. Australian freshwater assimineids, with a synopsis of the Recent genus-group taxa of the Assimineidae (Mollusca: Caenogastropoda: Rissooidea). Journal of Natural History, 37: 1977-2032

Assimineidae
Gastropods described in 1855